Éric Grauffel is a French sport pistol shooter in IPSC and firearms instructor with eight overall IPSC Handgun World Champion titles and one Junior World Champion title. Eric Grauffel is also the co-initiator of the EG-CZ Academy which is a training facility based in Quimper. He is known for having an unprecedented winning streak, and has won several hundreds IPSC President Medals. Additionally he has won the IPSC European Handgun Championships nine times. He is the son of the French national team trainer Gérard Grauffel.

Biography
Born and raised in Quimper, France (on the West coast), Eric still resides there when he is not traveling the world competing. He began shooting with an air gun at the age of eight. At age 10 he shot his first pistol and within a year Eric was competing. He won his first French National Championship at age 15 and his first world title at 18. Eric dedicates as many as three hours a day, five days a week in preparation for his sport. Each day he goes through a regimen of shooting and physical training. "This sport is basically technique, to be as skilled as possible you need to be like a thinking-robot."

In practical shooting, competitors are required to take shots from all different positions, locations and angles. Shots often come on the move or at moving targets. Because all shooters are highly skilled, any edge one of the top competitors can get through physical training is very important. In addition to several practice sessions, Eric also spends several hours reloading each day. Grauffel says reloading his own ammo is much more cost-efficient and many competitors do this because it allows them to personally control everything about their ammunition.

Endorsements
Eric Grauffel is part of the famous CZ Shooting Team, Armscor, EG-CZ Academy, 5.11, Dillon Precision 

 Ben Stoeger, American sport shooter
 Max Michel, American sport shooter
 Jorge Ballesteros, Spanish sport shooter

References
 Full results

1979 births
Living people
French male sport shooters
IPSC World Shoot Champions
IPSC shooters